Alzira may refer to:
Alzira (opera), an opera by Giuseppe Verdi
Alzira, Valencia, a town in Spain, also known as Alcira